The 2011 Villanova Wildcats football team represented Villanova University in the 2011 NCAA Division I FCS football season. The Wildcats were led by 27th year head coach Andy Talley and played their home games at Villanova Stadium. They are a member of the Colonial Athletic Association. They finished the season 2–9, 1–7 in CAA play to finish in ninth place.

Schedule

References

Villanova
Villanova Wildcats football seasons
Villanova Wildcats football